Jules Feller (4 November 1859 – 29 April 1940) was a  Belgian academician and Walloon militant.

Biography
This is also used for writing the Picard language since a consensus arose between universities in favour of the written form known as Feller-Carton (based on the Walloon spelling system – which was developed by Feller and adapted for Picard by Prof. Fernand Carton).

He was a member of the  Royal Academy of French Language and Literature in Belgium.

People from Roubaix
Linguists
Members of the Belgian Federal Parliament
Members of the Académie royale de langue et de littérature françaises de Belgique
1859 births
1940 deaths